The 2021 World Ski Orienteering Championships were held from 24 to 28 February 2021 in Kääriku, Estonia.

Medal summary

Medal table

Men

Women

Mixed

References

External links
Official website

World Ski Orienteering Championships
World Ski Orienteering Championships
International sports competitions hosted by Estonia
World Ski Orienteering Championships
2021 in orienteering